F. L. Věk is a historical novel written by a Czech writer Alois Jirásek. It is the largest (5 volumes) and the most artistically valuable work by Jirásek. The novel is set during early stage of the Czech National Revival. Jirásek started to work on it in 1888, the first volume was published in 1891 and the last one in 1906.

The character of F.L. Věk is based on life of František Ladislav Hek, a participant in the revival. The novel also portrays actor and writer Václav Thám and publisher Václav Matěj Kramerius, important figures of the national revival.

The novel was published several times and was filmed in 1971 TV series F. L. Věk. The town Dobruška (where Hek had lived and where most of the novel is set) named its main square after the literal figure (Náměstí F.L. Věka). Since 2011, there is organized The International Music Festival of F. L. Vek. 

Novels by Alois Jirásek
1891 Czech novels
20th-century Czech novels
Novels adapted into television shows